K Vijay Kumar, IPS (born 15 September 1952), is a retired IPS officer. He was the chief of the Special Task Force of Tamil Nadu that was involved in the death of the Veerappan during Operation Cocoon of 2004. He had also been the senior advisor to Home Ministry for the Left Wing Extremism areas. He served as the Advisor to the Governor of Jammu and Kashmir with Home, Forest, Ecology & Environment, Health & Medical Education, Youth Services & Sports, Hospitality & Protocol, Civil Aviation, Estates and Information portfolios. Currently he has joined back as senior security adviser in Ministry of Home Affairs in December 2019.

Early life
Vijay Kumar grew up in Tamil Nadu with five other siblings. His father M. Krishnan Nair was a retired police officer. He has bachelor's and master's degrees in law (BL and ML) from Madras University and an MBA from Indira Gandhi National Open University (IGNOU). In 2010, he also earned his master's degree in business law at National Law School of India University, Bangalore.

Career
Vijay Kumar joined the Indian Police Service on 10 November 1975. He served as Assistant superintendent in Pattukkottai, Trichy and Sembiam. As Superintendent of Police, he served in Dharmapuri from 1982 to 1983 and Salem from 1983 to 1985. He assisted Walter Devaram during this tenure. He served from 1985 to 1990 in the Elite Special Protection Group (SPG) with former Prime Minister Rajiv Gandhi. In 1990, he was posted as the SP of Dindigul district followed by Vellore district in 1991. . In 1991 he along with Sanjay Arora went on to form the Special Security Group (SSG) to provide security to Former Chief Minister J. Jayalalithaa. In 1997 he was posted as the first Inspector General of Police for the South Zone of Tamil Nadu after having handled the caste clashes in the southern districts. He served from 1998 to 2000 as the Inspector General, Border Security Force (BSF) Srinagar during the peak of militancy. He also served as IG (Operations), BSF before being recalled to the state to head the operations to hunt the forest brigand Veerapan. In December 2001, he was appointed Commissioner of Police for Chennai city. The highlight of his career came was when he headed the task force operation, Operation Cocoon in which Veerappan was killed in October 2004.

In 2008, Vijay Kumar was chosen to head the Sardar Vallabhbhai Patel National Police Academy in Hyderabad. He served as the Director-general of Central Reserve Police Force (CRPF) from 2010 to 2012. In December 2012, the Union government appointed him as Senior Security Adviser in Ministry of Home Affairs in Government of India.

A 1975-batch IPS officer of Tamil Nadu cadre, Vijay Kumar had earlier served in the Kashmir Valley as Inspector General of BSF 1998-2001 when the border guarding force was actively involved in the counter-militancy operations. Vijay Kumar was shot to fame when he headed the Special Task Force (STF) for a long-time and strategised operations that culminated in the elimination of the dreaded sandalwood smuggler Veerappan in October 2004. He was appointed as Director General of the world's largest paramilitary force—the CRPF—after naxals killed 75 personnel in Dantewada in 2010.

In June 2018, Vijay Kumar was appointed as adviser to Governor Vohra, along with Chhattisgarh cadre IAS officer BVR Subrahmanyam. The names of advisers were cleared by the Ministry of Home Affairs in Government of India after the state was put under the Governor's rule. In Dec 2019, he was appointed as senior security adviser in the Ministry of Home Affairs, where he'll consult on the security-related matters of Union Territory of JK [Jammu and Kashmir]  and Left Wing Extremism-affected states.

Awards and recognitions 
During his 37 years of service he has been awarded with Jammu & Kashmir Medal, Counter Insurgency Medal, Police Medal for Meritorious Service in 1993, President’s Police Medal for Distinguished Service in 1999 and President’s Police Medal for Gallantry on 58th Independence Day in 2005 (for his role in catching Veerappan).

In popular culture
In 2013, Kannada film Attahasa based on the life and death of Veerappan, the role of Vijay Kumar was played by Arjun Sarja, and in 2016 the role was essayed by K. S. Sridhar in Killing Veerappan.

Book 
His book Veerappan: Chasing the Brigand gives an account of the rise and fall of Veerappan. The last section details about the Operation Cocoon.

References

1952 births
Indian civil servants
Indian police officers
Living people
Madras Christian College alumni
People from Tamil Nadu
St Joseph's College, Tiruchirappalli alumni
University of Madras alumni
Advisor to Governor of Jammu and Kashmir